Dusk Log is an EP from the album Summer Make Good that was released by múm in 2004.

Track listing
 "Kostrzyn" — 5:17
 "This Nothing Blowing in the Faraway" — 4:07
 "Will the Summer Make Good for All of Our Sins?" — 4:06
 "Boots of Fog" — 4:34

Label: Fat Cat (cd10fat03 / 10fat03)
Format: 3"CD

References

2004 EPs
FatCat Records EPs